American singer Michael Jackson released 67 singles as a lead artist, and 10 as a featured artist. One of the best-selling artists of all time, his album and single sales as of 2013 stood at 400 million.  In the United States, Jackson amassed 13 Billboard Hot 100 number-one singles (more than any other male artist in the Hot 100 era) and was the first artist to have a top-ten single in the Billboard Hot 100 in five different decades. In 2012, Jackson was ranked the fifth best selling singles artist in the United Kingdom with 15.3 million singles sold.

Jackson's first solo entry on the US Billboard Hot 100 songs chart was "Got to Be There", which peaked at number four in 1971. Jackson's first number-one hit on the chart was "Ben", in 1972. Jackson continued to release singles throughout the 1970s. The album Off the Wall (1979) contained five singles, including the chart-topping "Don't Stop 'Til You Get Enough" and "Rock with You". Both are certified multi-Platinum by the Recording Industry Association of America (RIAA) in the United States for sales in excess of 6 million copies. With the following singles "Off the Wall" and "She's Out of My Life" also reaching the US top 10, Jackson became the first solo artist to have four singles from the same album reach the top 10 of the Billboard Hot 100.

In 1982, Jackson released his sixth studio album, Thriller. "The Girl Is Mine", a collaboration with Paul McCartney, was released as the first single from the album. The single peaked at number two on the Billboard Hot 100. "Billie Jean" was the album's second single. The single topped the charts in 13 countries, including the United States. The single sold more than 10 million copies in the United States and over 1.4 million in the United Kingdom. "Beat It", released a month later, peaked at number one in nine countries and sold more than eight million copies in the US. "Thriller" was released in November 1983 and peaked at number four on the Billboard Hot 100. The single sold 10 million copies in the US alone, making it Jackson's best-selling single. In 1983, Jackson again collaborated with McCartney and "Say Say Say" was released as the first single from McCartney's 1983 album Pipes of Peace. It was a number-one hit in the United States. Jackson's seventh studio album, Bad (1987), produced nine singles with seven charting in the United States. Five of these singles ("I Just Can't Stop Loving You", "Bad", "The Way You Make Me Feel", "Man in the Mirror", and "Dirty Diana") reached number one on the Billboard Hot 100, a record for most number-one Hot 100 singles from any one album.

In 1991, Jackson released his eighth studio album, Dangerous, co-produced with Teddy Riley. The album produced four top-ten singles on the Billboard Hot 100: "Remember the Time", "In the Closet", "Will You Be There" (produced and performed by Jackson as the theme for the film Free Willy) and the number-one hit "Black or White". In June 1995, Jackson released his ninth album, HIStory: Past, Present and Future, Book I, a double album. The first disc, HIStory Begins, is a 15-track greatest hits album. The second disc, HIStory Continues, contains 13 original songs and two cover versions. The album features "Scream", a duet with Jackson's youngest sister Janet; "Earth Song"; "They Don't Care About Us"; and "You Are Not Alone". "You Are Not Alone" holds the Guinness World Record for the first song ever to debut at number one on the Billboard Hot 100 chart. "Earth Song" was the third single released from HIStory, and it topped the UK Singles Chart for six weeks over Christmas 1995 and sold over 1.2 million copies, making it one of Jackson's most successful singles in the UK. Jackson worked with collaborators including Teddy Riley and Rodney Jerkins to produce his tenth solo album, Invincible (2001). Invincible spawned three singles: "You Rock My World", "Cry", and "Butterflies". Following Jackson's death in 2009, sales of his previous work soared and Jackson became the first act to sell more than 1 million song downloads in a week, with 2.6 million downloads. Following the surge in sales, in March 2010, Sony Music signed a $250 million deal with the Jackson estate to extend their distribution rights to Jackson's back catalog until at least 2017. As part of this deal, two posthumous albums of previously unreleased tracks were released. In 2017, Sony renewed its deal for $250 million, which went into effect in January 2018.

As lead artist

As featured artist

Other appearances

Promotional or limited release

See also
 Michael Jackson albums discography
 Michael Jackson videography
 List of songs recorded by Michael Jackson
 List of unreleased songs recorded by Michael Jackson
 The Jackson 5 discography
 List of artists who reached number one in the United States
 List of Billboard number-one dance club songs
 List of artists by total number of UK number one singles
 List of artists who reached number one on the U.S. dance chart

Notes

References

Discographies of American artists
Pop music discographies
Rhythm and blues discographies
Disco discographies